Quirinus of Rome can refer to two saints:

Quirinus of Neuss
Quirinus of Tegernsee